David Michael Staton, better known as Mick Staton (February 11, 1940 – April 14, 2014) was an American banker and politician. He was a Republican  congressman from West Virginia, serving one term in the  U.S. House of Representatives from 1981 to 1983.

Biography 
Staton was born in Parkersburg, a city in Wood County, West Virginia. He was a 1958 graduate of Parkersburg High School. He studied at Concord College in Athens, West Virginia, from 1961 until 1963. From 1957 to 1965, he served in the Army National Guard.

Staton served as the data processing manager and, later, vice president at Kanawha Valley Bank in Charleston, where he worked from 1972 until 1980.

Political career 
Staton was active in West Virginia's Republican party. He served as a state Republican convention delegate in 1976 and 1980 and was a delegate to the 1980 Republican National Convention. He was unsuccessful in his first bid for Congress, in 1978, when he lost to longtime 3rd Congressional District incumbent John M. Slack, Jr. However, Staton was elected to the House of Representatives from the district in 1980, when he defeated incumbent Democrat John G. Hutchinson, who was elected in the special election after Slack's death. Staton served in the House for a single term (1981-1983). He was defeated for re-election in 1982 by future governor, Bob Wise.

Later career and death 
After losing his seat in the House of Representatives, Staton served as chief political advisor to the U.S. Chamber of Commerce from 1984 until 1990. Staton served as an elector for Mitt Romney and Paul Ryan in 2012.

Staton died on April 14, 2014 at Winchester Medical Center in Winchester, Virginia. Prior to his death, he resided in Inwood, West Virginia.

References

External links

1940 births
2014 deaths
Concord University alumni
Parkersburg High School alumni
2012 United States presidential electors
People from Inwood, West Virginia
Politicians from Parkersburg, West Virginia
Businesspeople from West Virginia
United States Chamber of Commerce people
West Virginia National Guard personnel
Republican Party members of the United States House of Representatives from West Virginia
20th-century American politicians
20th-century American businesspeople
Members of Congress who became lobbyists